Microphyes may refer to:
 Microphyes (plant), a genus of plants in the family Caryophyllaceae
 Microphyes, a genus of beetles in the family Curculionidae, synonym of Nanomicrophyes
 Microphyes, a genus of beetles in the family Tenebrionidae, synonym of Alphitobius